Orillia Ramara Regional Airport  is a registered aerodrome located  northeast of Orillia, Ontario, Canada.

The airport is classified as an airport of entry by Nav Canada and is staffed by the Canada Border Services Agency (CBSA). CBSA officers at this airport can handle general aviation aircraft only, with no more than 15 passengers.

See also
 Orillia/Lake St John Water Aerodrome
 Orillia/Matchedash Lake Water Aerodrome

References

External links
Fly Orillia

Registered aerodromes in Ontario
Transport in Orillia
Buildings and structures in Simcoe County